South Carolina Highway 802 (SC 802), is a  state highway located entirely within Beaufort County, South Carolina. Also known locally as Sams Point Road, SC 802 serves as the principal arterial for Lady's Island and provides the only access to Coosaw Island.

Route description
SC 802 runs in a generally southwest to northeast direction.  SC 802 travels along the entirety of Sams Point Road, beginning at the intersection of U.S. Route 21 (US 21) and US 21 Business within the city limits of Beaufort on Lady's Island. The intersection is surrounded by numerous commercial businesses. Heading north along the four-lane Sams Point Road, SC 802 heads through a residential neighborhood with a high density of trees. The highway exits the city and travels through unincorporated areas for the remainder of its route. At Brickyard Point Road, the highway intersects the road at a roundabout and thereafter, SC 802 is only two lanes wide. Continuing north on the island, the highway begins to curve to the east and reaches the community of Wilkins. It crosses the Lucy Creek on the L.G. Barnwell Bridge in enter Coosaw Island. The highway officially ends at the eastern end of the bridge though an end SC 802 sign assembly is found further east along Coosaw River Drive.

History
Until 2012, SC 802 was a  route that traversed Lady's Island, Port Royal, and Shell Point along Lady's Island Drive, Ribaut Road, Parris Island Gateway, and Savannah Highway. With the re-routing of US 21 on February 26, 2012, the route for SC 802 was truncated to the current . The Savannah Highway portion of SC 802 became SC 128, while other portions of the route were re-designated as US 21.

Major intersections

See also

References

External links

SC 802 at Virginia Highways' South Carolina Highways Annex

802
Transportation in Beaufort County, South Carolina
Beaufort, South Carolina
U.S. Route 21